Khan Khökhii is a mountain of the Uvs Province in Mongolia. It has an elevation of 2,928 metres (9,606 ft).

References 

Mountains of Mongolia
Uvs Province
Two-thousanders of Mongolia